Juno Ju-X is a product design engineer for music and sound creation and also a brand name for his solo work.

History

Ju-X was created in April 2003 by Juno Ju-X, who initially repaired rare electronics and electronic musical instruments. In 2006, the company began offering services to modify music sequencers and drum machines. In 2009, they made a move towards the software industry.

Products

GIMMICK

Gimmick is an FM-based software synthesizer that features a new, original graphical oscillator that was invented by Juno Ju-X.

SEQUERA

Sequera is a stand-alone software step sequencer for Mac OS X. This program is designed for the next generation by variety of unique approaches when experimenting with MIDI composition.

HOSTING AU

Hosting AU is a micro-sized Digital Audio Workstation for Mac OSX that hosts Audio Unit instruments and effect plugins. It comes with 4ch+1 mixer, external audio input, 24-bit recorder, and music-typing feature called “LazyKey."

References

 http://www.musicradar.com/news/tech/hosting-au-the-free-mac-microdaw-600750/
 http://www.synthtopia.com/content/2014/06/01/free-microdaw-for-os-x-hosting-au/
 http://www.bedroomproducersblog.com/2014/06/01/free-au-plugin-host/
 http://www.hispasonic.com/blogs/viernes-freeware-54-hosting-au-eclipsis-tenq/40052
 http://www.studiotoolz.net/hosting-au-vstau-host-macosx/

Music companies of the United States
Music technology